Blueprint for a Sunrise is a 2001 concept album of experimental feminist rock by Yoko Ono. It features live tracks, samples and remixes of previous recordings, and a sequel. The recurring theme throughout is the suffering of women. In the liner notes, Ono talks about the continuing relevance of feminism and "waking up in the middle of the night hearing thousands of women screaming". As of September 2009, the album had sold around 3,000 copies in the USA.

Track listing

 "Wouldnit "swing"" is a remix of "Wouldnit" from Rising
 "Soul Got Out of the Box" was originally a 1972 outtake from Approximately Infinite Universe
 "Rising II" and "Mulberry" are live performances.
 The Queen Charlotte's Hospital tape demo of "Mulberry" was previously released in 1997 on the CD Reissue of Life with the Lions
 "I Remember Everything" was written for the play "Hiroshima" (1997) after much coaxing from Playwright Ron Destro.  In addition, this song was performed live at the Itsukushima Shrine in Japan 1995.
 The Japanese bonus tracks were previously released as singles in 1973 and 1974.

A Blueprint for a Sunrise

This CD was included with the book Yes Yoko Ono published in 2000. An exhibition with the same title was held at the Japan Society Gallery in New York City from October 18, 2000, to January 14, 2001.

Alternate versions of "Are You Looking for Me?" and "It's Time for Action" would be included on Yoko's 2001 studio album Blueprint for a Sunrise.

Personnel

 Yoko Ono – lead vocals
 Sean Lennon – guitars, keyboards
 Timo Ellis – guitars, bass guitar, drums
 Chris Maxwell – guitars
 Erik Sanko – bass guitar
 Zeena Parkins – electric harp
 Hearn Gadbois – percussion
 Ringo Starr – drums
 Sam Koppelman – drums, percussion

It's Time for Action
 Yoko Ono – English
 Yodit Abate – Ethiopian
 Nikki Borodi – Hungarian / Russian / Hebrew
 Manjit Devgun – Punjabi
 Ghida Fakhry – Arabic
 Dania Hachey – French
 Nazan Karsan – Turkish
 Eva Lee – Chinese
 Young Wha Lee – Korean
 Maike Paul – German
 Anne Terada – Poruguese
 Midori Yoshimoto – Japanese
 Eva Zanardi – Italian
 Fatemeh Ziai – Persian

Release History

References

2001 albums
Yoko Ono albums
Capitol Records albums
Albums produced by Yoko Ono